Annalisa Bona (born 15 November 1982) is an Italian former tennis player. On 14 May 2012, she reached her highest singles ranking by the Women's Tennis Association (WTA) of 235. In April 2012, she reached her first WTA Tour main draw at the Barcelona Ladies Open.

ITF Circuit finals

Singles (2–8)

Doubles (0–2)

References

External links
 
 

1982 births
Living people
Sportspeople from Genoa
Italian female tennis players
21st-century Italian women